USS Craster Hall (ID-1486) was a cargo steamship that was built in Scotland in 1909 and served in the merchant fleets of first the United Kingdom and then the United States. In 1918–19 she served in the United States Navy. In 1927 she was damaged in a collision off the coast of Peru, was beached to prevent her sinking, but was wrecked.

Building and first owner
William Hamilton and Company built the ship in Port Glasgow on the River Clyde, launching her on 4 February 1909.

The ship's first owners were Charles G Dunn and Company of Liverpool, who named their ships after English country houses whose name ended in "Hall". "Craster Hall" may refer to Dunstan Hall in the parish of Craster in Northumberland. Dunn & Co registered her at Liverpool. Her United Kingdom official number was 127964 and her code letters were HNRD.

US ownership
In 1914 the United States Steel Products Co bought three of CG Dunn's ships: , Craster Hall and Crofton Hall, and registered them in New York. Craster Halls US official number was 212886 and her code letters were LDQC. By 1917 she was equipped for wireless telegraphy. By 1918 her call sign was KLK.

On 25 April 1918 the United States Shipping Board transferred Craster Hall to the US Navy. On 9 May she was ommissioned as USS Craster Hall, with the Identification Number (ID) 1486. She was defensively armed with one 5-inch/51-caliber gun and one 6-pounder gun.

Between 25 May 1918 and 7 January 1919 Craster Hall made three voyages from the US to France with the Naval Overseas Transportation Service. She took steel billets, mail, flatcars, Army trucks, engines and airplanes to Bordeaux and Le Verdon-sur-Mer, Army supplies to Quiberon, Saint-Nazaire, and Nantes, and 353 horses to Pauillac. On 5 February 1919 the Navy decommissioned Craster Hall and returned her via the Shipping Board to her owners.

On 27 June 1927 Craster Hall was involved in a collision with Imperial Oil's motor tanker Reginolite off the coast of Peru, and was beached at Talara Point.

References

Bibliography

External links

1909 ships
Cargo ships of the United States Navy
Merchant ships of the United Kingdom
Merchant ships of the United States
Ships built on the River Clyde
Shipwrecks of Peru
Steamships of the United Kingdom
Steamships of the United States
World War I cargo ships of the United States